The Journal of Artificial Societies and Social Simulation (JASSS) is a quarterly peer-reviewed academic journal created by Nigel Gilbert (University of Surrey).  The current editor is Flaminio Squazzoni. The journal publishes articles in computational sociology, social simulation, complexity science, and artificial societies. Its approach is multi-disciplinary, integrating sociology, economy, computer science, or physics. The journal is published open access.

References

External links 
 

Open access journals
Sociology journals
Publications established in 1998
Quarterly journals
English-language journals